Anna Kathryn Mapp (born 1970) is an American chemist and the Edwin Vedejs collegiate professor of Chemistry. In 2013, Mapp joined the Michigan Life Sciences Institute as a research professor. Mapp served as the Director of the Program in Chemical Biology at the University of Michigan until 2019 when she accepted a position as the Associate Dean for Academic Programs and Initiatives at the University of Michigan Rackham graduate school.

Early life and education 
Mapp completed her Bachelor of the Arts (B.A.) in chemistry at Bryn Mawr college. She continued her graduate studies at the University of California, Berkeley. She completed her Ph.D. under the supervision of Clayton H. Heathcock in 1997. In the 2000s she continued her postdoctoral studies at Caltech with Peter B. Dervan. She then started working at the Department of Chemistry in University of Michigan in 2000 where she is currently serving as a Professor of Chemistry.

Research 
Mapp's research group employs synthetic tools to study biological systems to understand how genes are regulated. The group identifies key protein-protein interactions vital for gene activation in yeast (S. cerevisiae). Their main goal is to  develop drugs that can re-wire gene expression in diseased cells while leaving the rest intact.

References

External links 

 Academic Family Tree
 Life Sciences Institute faculty profile
 Department of Chemistry Faculty Profile

1970 births
University of Michigan faculty
21st-century American chemists
American women scientists
Women chemists
Living people
Sloan Research Fellows
Sloan Fellows
American women academics
21st-century American women scientists